Ursula Sarahí González Zárate (born November 22, 1991, in Ciudad Victoria, Tamaulipas) is a Mexican sabre fencer. She won a silver medal, as a member of the host nation's fencing team, in the same weapon at the 2011 Pan American Games in Guadalajara, Mexico.

Gonzalez represented Mexico at the 2012 Summer Olympics in London, where she competed in the women's individual sabre event. Unfortunately, she lost the first preliminary round match to South Korea's Kim Ji-Yeon, who eventually won a gold medal in the final, with a final score of 3–15.

She competed in the individual and team sabre events at the 2016 Summer Olympics.  She finished in 31st place in the individual event and Mexico finished in 7th in the team event.

References

External links
Profile at FIE 
NBC 2012 Olympics profile 
 

1991 births
Living people
Mexican female sabre fencers
Olympic fencers of Mexico
Fencers at the 2012 Summer Olympics
Fencers at the 2016 Summer Olympics
Fencers at the 2011 Pan American Games
Pan American Games silver medalists for Mexico
People from Ciudad Victoria
Pan American Games medalists in fencing
Medalists at the 2011 Pan American Games
Fencers at the 2015 Pan American Games
21st-century Mexican women